Serge Rousseau (13 March 1930 – 3 November 2007) was a French film and television actor and agent.  He was a close friend of François Truffaut.  He played the murdered husband of Jeanne Moreau in The Bride Wore Black and the unknown man who declares his love for Claude Jade at the end of Stolen Kisses.  He married Marie Dubois in 1961 and they remained together until his death by cancer at the age of 77. They had a daughter, actress Dominique Rousseau.

Selected filmography 
 Maigret et l'Affaire Saint-Fiacre (1959) - Émile Gaulthier
 Le bonheur est pour demain (1961) - Le jeune caréneur
 Les Mauvais Coups (1961) - Duval
 Portrait-robot (1962)
 La foire aux cancres (Chronique d'une année scolaire) (1963) - L'aspirant
 Mata Hari, Agent H21 (1964) - (uncredited)
 Thomas l'imposteur (1965)
 The Sleeping Car Murders (1965) - Le contrôleur du train
 Is Paris Burning? (1966) - Col. Fabien (uncredited)
 The Bride Wore Black (1968) - David
 Stolen Kisses (1968) - Le type qui suit Christine
 Bed and Board (1970) - Petit rôle (uncredited)
 Nous n'irons plus au bois (1970) - Albert
 Les zozos (1973) - Le Professeur
 The Green Room (1978) - Paul Masigny
 Patrick Dewaere (1992) - Himself
 La Cérémonie (1995) - (final film role)

References

External links

1930 births
2007 deaths
People from Orne
French male film actors
French male television actors